The Tower of Sacru is a ruined Genoese tower located in the commune of Brando, Haute-Corse on the east coast of the Corsica. Only part of the base survives.

The tower was one of a series of coastal defences constructed by the Republic of Genoa between 1530 and 1620 to stem the attacks by Barbary pirates.

See also
List of Genoese towers in Corsica

References

Towers in Corsica